The 2003 Ontario Scott Tournament of Hearts, the provincial women's championship in Ontario was held January 25-February 2 at the Hershey Centre in Mississauga.  The Anne Dunn rink from Cambridge, Ontario won the event. She and her rink of Lindy Marchuk, Gloria Campbell and Fran Todd would go on to represent Ontario at the 2003 Scott Tournament of Hearts. The event was held in conjunction with the 2003 Ontario Nokia Cup, the Ontario men's curling championship.

Standings
Final standings:

Tie breaker
George 8-6 Rizzo

Playoffs

References
 

Ontario Scotties Tournament of Hearts
2003 in Canadian curling
2003 in Ontario
Sport in Mississauga